Rachelle Paul (born June 16, 1981) is the current director of athletics for Saint Peter's University. She previously served as a senior associate athletic director at Seton Hall University from 2015 to 2019, and at Monmouth University from 2012 to 2015. Paul previously held administrative positions at Canisius College, the Northeast Conference, and the Metro Atlantic Athletic Conference. Paul attended college at Canisius College, where she played on the school's women's lacrosse team from 2000 to 2003. She also played on the soccer team as a defender in 2002, making eleven appearances. Paul was named athletic director at Saint Peter's University on October 30, 2019.

References

External links
 
Saint Peter's bio
Monmouth bio

1981 births
Living people
Canisius Golden Griffins women's lacrosse players
Canisius Golden Griffins women's soccer players
Women college athletic directors in the United States
Women's association football defenders
American women's soccer players